This article lists political parties in Guinea. 
Guinea has a multi-party system with various parties in the country.

Political parties

Parliamentary parties

Other parties
African Democratic Party of Guinea
Party of Unity and Progress (PUP)
Union for Progress and Renewal (UPR)
Union for Progress of Guinea (UPG)
National Alliance for Progress (ANP)
Party of the Union for Development (PUD)
Union of Democratic Forces of Guinea (UFDG), led by Cellou Dalein Diallo
Union of Republican Forces (UFR)
 (PADES), led by Ousmane Kaba

Defunct 
Socialist Democracy of Guinea (Démocratie Socialiste de Guinée, DSG), active 1954-1958

Ethnic politics 
President Alpha Conde derives support from Guinea's second-largest ethnic group, the Malinke. Guinea's opposition is backed by the Fula ethnic group, who account for around 40 percent of the population.

See also
 Politics of Guinea
 List of political parties by country

References 

Guinea
 
Parties
Guinea
Political parties